The women's qualification for the Olympic volleyball tournament will occur between September 2023 and June 2024, allocating twelve teams for the final tournament. As the host nation, France reserves a direct spot each for the women's team, marking the country's maiden participation in the Olympic tournament.

The remainder of the twelve-team field must endure a dual qualification pathway to secure the quota places for Paris 2024. First, the winners and runners-up from each of the three Olympic qualification tournaments will qualify directly for the Games. Second, the last five berths will be attributed to the eligible NOCs based on the FIVB world rankings by June 2024, abiding by the universality principle, that is, prioritizing those from the continents without a qualified team yet in the Paris 2024 tournament.

Qualification summary
{| class="wikitable" width=80%
|-
!width=30% colspan="2"|Qualification!!width=23%|Date!!width=18%|Venue!!width=10%|Berths!!width=15%|Qualified team
|-
|colspan="2"|Host nation
|colspan="2" 
|style="text-align:center"|1
|
|-
|rowspan="6"|FIVB Olympic Qualification Tournaments||rowspan="2"|Pool A
|rowspan="6"|16–24 September 2023
|rowspan="2"|
|rowspan="2" style="text-align:center"|2
|
|-
|
|-
|rowspan="2"|Pool B
|rowspan="2"|
|rowspan="2" style="text-align:center"|2
|
|-
|
|-
|rowspan="2"|
|rowspan="2"|
|rowspan="2" style="text-align:center"|2
|
|-
|
|-
|rowspan="5" colspan="2"|World Ranking qualification pathway
|rowspan="5"|17 June 2024
|rowspan="5"| Lausanne
|rowspan="5" style="text-align:center"|5
|
|-
|
|-
|
|-
|
|-
|
|-
!colspan="4"|Total
!12
!
|}

Timeline

Pool standing procedure
For all qualification tournaments:
 Total number of victories (matches won, matches lost)
 In the event of a tie, the following first tiebreaker will apply: The teams will be ranked by the most points gained per match as follows:
Match won 3–0 or 3–1: 3 points for the winner, 0 points for the loser
Match won 3–2: 2 points for the winner, 1 point for the loser
Match forfeited: 3 points for the winner, 0 points (0–25, 0–25, 0–25) for the loser
 If teams are still tied after examining the number of victories and points gained, then the FIVB will examine the results in order to break the tie in the following order:
Sets quotient: if two or more teams are tied on the number of points gained, they will be ranked by the quotient resulting from the division of the number of all sets won by the number of all sets lost.
Points quotient: if the tie persists based on the sets quotient, the teams will be ranked by the quotient resulting from the division of all points scored by the total of points lost during all sets.
If the tie persists based on the points quotient, the tie will be broken based on the team that won the match of the round-robin phase between the tied teams. When the tie-in points quotient lies between three or more teams, these teams are ranked taking into consideration only the matches involving the teams in question.

Host country
FIVB reserved a berth for the 2024 Summer Olympics host country to participate in the tournament.

FIVB Olympic Qualification Tournament

As a principal route for the tournament, the winners and runners-up in each of the three qualification pools will secure the quota places for Paris 2024.

Qualified teams 
FIVB released the names of the twenty-four teams eligible to compete in the women's Olympic qualification tournaments for Paris 2024 through the federation's world rankings of 12 September 2022 (except France — qualified for the Games as the host nation; and Russia — ineligible because of the country's instigation to the 2022 Russian invasion of Ukraine).

Pool draw

Pool A (China)

Pool B (Japan)

Pool C (Poland)

World ranking qualification 
The remaining five berths will be attributed to the highest-ranked eligible NOCs based on the FIVB world rankings at the end of the 2024 FIVB Volleyball Nations League preliminary phase. Under the universality principle, the teams will be selected according to the order of priority: 1) those from the continent without a qualified team; and 2) highest-ranked eligible NOCs irrespective of the continent.

See also
 Volleyball at the 2024 Summer Olympics – Men's qualification

References

Women
Qualification for the 2024 Summer Olympics
2024